The Uncle from the Provinces (German: Der Provinzonkel) is a 1926 German silent film directed by Manfred Noa and starring Jakob Tiedtke, Margarete Kupfer and Liane Haid.

The film's sets were designed by Julius von Borsody.

Cast
 Jakob Tiedtke as Provinzonkel 
 Margarete Kupfer as Provinzonkels Gattin  
 Liane Haid as Die Tänzerin  
 Harry Hardt as Der Braütigam  
 Lotte Lorring as Köchin  
 Fritz Kampers as Der diener- Küchins Braütigam  
 Sig Arno as Schieber

References

Bibliography
 Grange, William. Cultural Chronicle of the Weimar Republic. Scarecrow Press, 2008.

External links

1926 films
Films of the Weimar Republic
Films directed by Manfred Noa
German silent feature films
German black-and-white films